Pomaderris crassifolia is a species of flowering plant in the family Rhamnaceae and is endemic to eastern Australia. It is a shrub with hairy young stems, egg-shaped or elliptic leaves, and clusters of cream-coloured or yellow flowers.

Description
The upper surface of the leaves is glabrous and the lower surface densely covered with woolly hairs. Flowering occurs in August and September.

Taxonomy
Pomaderris crassifolia was first formally described in 1997 by Neville Grant Walsh and Fiona Coates and the description was published in the journal Muelleria from specimens collected by Paul Irwin Forster in the MacPherson Range in 1990.

Distribution and habitat
This pomaderris grows in heathland, shrubland and woodland in rocky places on cliffs and mountains mainly near Warwick and in the MacPherson Range in Queensland, with a disjunct population near Gloucester in New South Wales.

References

crassifolia
Flora of Queensland
Flora of New South Wales
Plants described in 1997